Swaret was a program for the Slackware Linux distribution that resolves dependencies. Swaret stands for SlackWARE Tool.

Features
True library dependency resolution
Rollback capability
Logging
3rd party software repository support
Support for http, ftp, rsync, and local filesystems

History
The program was created by Luc Cottyn, and was originally called "autopkg".  However, because of a conflict with another project of the same name it was renamed to swaret. It has no active maintainer.

References

External links

Slackware
Free package management systems
Linux package management-related software
Linux-only free software